To Live A Lie is an American Independent record label, based in Raleigh, North Carolina, founded in 2005 by Will Butler.

The label has released albums by bands such as Magrudergrind, ACxDC, Agathocles, Godstomper, WVRM, Unholy Grave, XBRAINIAX, Despise You, Suffering Luna and Backslider. Some of the artists, who recorded for the label include Assholeparade, Torch Runner, Funeral Chic, Nashgul and Sex Prisoner.

History 
The record label was founded in 2005 and it debuted in August 2005, with a split 7-inch featuring California's Godstomper and Maryland's Magrudergrind.

In January 2014, the company organized its inaugural festival, To Live A Lie Records Fest in Raleigh, which was also attended by Sex Prisoner and Assholeparade.

In 2020, the label started to be the exclusive mailorder of 625 Thrashcore.

In December 2021, the label helped setup and host two memorial shows for John Rivera from Headfirst Records/Punks On Paper alongside 533 Uprisings, Paul Genet, Bitter Melody Records, and Caroline Weiss 

.

Notable artists 

 Agathocles
 Amps for Christ
 Assholeparade
 ACxDC
 Bastard Noise
 Beartrap
 Despise You
 Gasp 
 Gel
 Magrudergrind
 Sex Prisoner
 Suffering Luna
 Spy
 Torch Runner
 Pig City
 Regional Justice Center
 Unholy Grave
 Venomous Concept
 XBRAINIAX

Discography

See also

 List of record labels
 List of independent record labels

References

External links 
 
 F

Record labels established in 2005
American independent record labels